Telugu Nadu Students Federation (TNSF) is a Students' Wing of the Telugu Desam Party. It is being Organised by National Party convenor Nara Lokesh.

See also
 World Organisation of Students and Youth

References

External links
 Telugu Nadu Students Federation  on Facebook
 Telugu Nadu Students Federation on YouTube

Student organisations in India
Student wings of political parties in India